Negel may refer to the following places:
 Negel, Ilam, Iran
 Negel, Kurdistan, Iran
 Negel Rural District, in Kurdistan Province, Iran
 Negel (river), a tributary of the Trebeș in eastern Romania